Richard Johann Kuhn (3 December 1900 – 1 August 1967) was an Austrian-German biochemist who was awarded the Nobel Prize in Chemistry in 1938 "for his work on carotenoids and vitamins".

Biography

Early life
Kuhn was born in Vienna, Austria, where he attended grammar school and high school. His interest in chemistry surfaced early; however he had many interests and decided late to study chemistry. Between 1910 and 1918 he was a schoolmate of Wolfgang Pauli, who was awarded the Nobel Prize in Physics for 1945. Beginning in 1918, Kuhn attended lectures at the University of Vienna in chemistry. He finished his chemistry studies at University of Munich and received his doctoral degree in 1922 with Richard Willstätter for a scientific work on enzymes.

After graduating, Kuhn continued his scientific career, first in Munich, then at the ETH Zurich and from 1929 onwards at the University of Heidelberg, where he was head of the chemistry department beginning in 1937. In 1928 he married Daisy Hartmann and the couple subsequently had two sons and four daughters.

Research 

Kuhn's areas of study included: investigations of theoretical problems of organic chemistry (stereochemistry of aliphatic and aromatic compounds; syntheses of polyenes and cumulenes; constitution and colour; the acidity of hydrocarbons), as well as extensive fields in biochemistry (carotenoids; flavins; vitamins and enzymes). Specifically, he carried out important work on vitamin B2 and the antidermatitis vitamin B6.

In 1929 he became Principal of the Institute for Chemistry at the newly founded Kaiser Wilhelm Institute for Medical Research (which, since 1950, has been renamed the Max Planck Institute for Medical Research in Heidelberg).  By 1937 he also took over the administration of this Institute.

In addition to these duties he also served as of Professor of Biochemistry at the University of Heidelberg, and for one year he was at the University of Pennsylvania, Philadelphia, as a Visiting Research Professor for Physiological Chemistry.

He was subsequently awarded the Nobel Prize in Chemistry in 1938 for his "work on carotenoids and vitamins," but rejected the prize as Hitler had forbidden German citizens to accept it. In a hand-written letter, he even described the awarding of the prize to a German as an invitation to violate a decree of the Führer. He received the award after World War II. Kuhn is also credited with the discovery of the deadly nerve agent Soman in 1944.

Kuhn was editor of Justus Liebigs Annalen der Chemie from 1948.

Kuhn died in 1967 in Heidelberg, Germany, aged 66.

Nazi era
Kuhn collaborated with high-ranking Nazi officials and denounced three of his Jewish co-workers in 1936.

In 2005, the Society of German Chemists (Gesellschaft Deutscher Chemiker, GDCh) declared their intention to no longer award the Richard Kuhn Medal: "The board of the GDCh intends to discontinue awarding the Medal named after the organic chemist, Nobel Prize laureate of the year 1938 and President of the GDCh in 1964–65, Richard Kuhn. The board thereby draws the consequences out of research on Richard Kuhn's behaviour during National Socialism. Even though the question of whether Kuhn was a convinced National Socialist or just a career-oriented camp follower is not fully answered, he undisputably supported the Nazi-regime in administrative and organizational ways, especially by his scientific work. Despite his scientific achievements, Kuhn is not suitable to serve as a role model, and eponym for an important award, mainly due to his unreflected research on poison gas, but also due to his conduct towards Jewish colleagues" (Nachrichten aus der Chemie 54, May 2006, p. 514).

Honours and awards
 1938: Nobel Prize in Chemistry
 1952: Wilhelm Exner Medal
 1960: Honorary doctorate from the University of Vienna
 1961: Austrian Decoration for Science and Art

References

[this reference does not seem to say what it is claimed to]

External links

 1938 Nobel Prize in Chemistry
 
 

1900 births
1967 deaths
Austrian biochemists
Austrian Nobel laureates
Austro-Hungarian Nobel laureates
Academic staff of ETH Zurich
German biochemists
German Nobel laureates
Scientists from Vienna
Nobel laureates in Chemistry
Ludwig Maximilian University of Munich alumni
University of Vienna alumni
Members of the Prussian Academy of Sciences
Recipients of the Austrian Decoration for Science and Art
Recipients of the Pour le Mérite (civil class)
Members of the German Academy of Sciences at Berlin
Vitamin researchers
Presidents of the German Chemical Society
Max Planck Institute directors
Austrian Nazis